Karla Fernandez Beaumont (born ) was a Venezuelan female weightlifter, competing in the 53 kg category and representing Venezuela at international competitions. 

She participated at the 2000 Summer Olympics in the 53 kg event. She competed at world championships, most recently at the 2003 World Weightlifting Championships.

Major results

References

External links
 
 http://de.alamy.com/stock-photo-venezuelan-weightlifter-karla-fernandez-fails-in-her-975-kgs-attempt-121238493.html
http://www.todor66.com/olim/2000/Weightlifting/Women_under_53kg.htmlv

1977 births
Living people
Venezuelan female weightlifters
Weightlifters at the 2000 Summer Olympics
Olympic weightlifters of Venezuela
Place of birth missing (living people)
Weightlifters at the 2003 Pan American Games
Pan American Games competitors for Venezuela
20th-century Venezuelan women
21st-century Venezuelan women